17α-Epiestriol, or simply 17-epiestriol, also known as 16α-hydroxy-17α-estradiol or estra-1,3,5(10)-triene-3,16α,17α-triol, is a minor and weak endogenous estrogen, and the 17α-epimer of estriol (which is 16α-hydroxy-17β-estradiol). It is formed from 16α-hydroxyestrone. In contrast to other endogenous estrogens like estradiol, 17α-epiestriol is a selective agonist of the ERβ. It is described as a relatively weak estrogen, which is in accordance with its relatively low affinity for the ERα. 17α-Epiestriol has been found to be approximately 400-fold more potent than estradiol in inhibiting tumor necrosis factor α (TNFα)-induced vascular cell adhesion molecule 1 (VCAM-1) expression in vitro.

See also 
 Epimestrol
 16β,17α-Epiestriol
 16β-Epiestriol
 17α-Estradiol
 2-Methoxyestradiol

References 

Estranes
Estrogens
Hormones of the hypothalamus-pituitary-gonad axis
Selective ERβ agonists
Sex hormones